DeSalvo or De Salvo is an Italian surname. Notable people with the surname include:

People 
 Albert DeSalvo (1931–1973), American serial killer known as the Boston Strangler
 Karen DeSalvo (born 1966), American federal official
 Louise DeSalvo (1942–2018), American writer and professor
 Matt DeSalvo (born 1980), American baseball player
 Roman De Salvo (born 1965), American artist and sculptor
 Russ DeSalvo, American songwriter, musician and record producer

Fictional characters 
 Charlie DeSalvo, on the TV show Highlander: The Series

See also 
 DiSalvo, a list of people with the surname DiSalvo or Di Salvo
 Salvo (surname)

Italian-language surnames